Sandeep Kumar Thakur (born 1 January 1993) is an Indian cricketer. He made his List A debut for Arunachal Pradesh in the 2018–19 Vijay Hazare Trophy on 19 September 2018. He was the leading wicket-taker for Arunachal Pradesh in the 2018–19 Vijay Hazare Trophy, with eight dismissals in five matches. He made his first-class debut for Arunachal Pradesh in the 2018–19 Ranji Trophy on 1 November 2018.

References

External links
 

1993 births
Living people
Indian cricketers
Arunachal Pradesh cricketers
Place of birth missing (living people)